José Miguel Campos Rodríguez (born 12 August 1966) is a Spanish retired footballer who played as a defender, and most recently the manager of CF Salmantino.

Club career
Born in Mazarrón, Murcia, Campos graduated with Real Murcia's youth setup, and made his senior debuts with the reserves in Tercera División. He subsequently appeared in Segunda División B with CD Alcoyano, Real Jaén, Mármol Macael CD and UD Melilla; he retired with Mármol in 1999, aged 33.

Manager career
Campos started his managerial career with CD Atlético Abarán in 2000, and after taking the club back to the fourth level, joined CD Bala Azul. In 2003, he was appointed CD Baza manager, winning promotion at the end of the 2004–05 campaign.

After narrowly avoiding relegation with Baza, Campos returned to Murcia Imperial, being again promoted to the third level. On 19 June 2008 he renewed with the club, being appointed at the helm of the main squad on 18 December, replacing fired Javier Clemente.

On 24 March 2009, after taking the club out of the relegation places, Campos renewed with the Pimentoneros. He was sacked on 2 November, after making only seven points in ten matches.

On 5 July 2010 Campos was appointed Real Jaén manager. He was relieved from his duties in January of the following year, being replaced by Manolo Herrero.

On 20 May 2013 Campos joined FC Cartagena, already qualified for the play-offs. After being knocked out by Caudal Deportivo and thus not obtaining promotion, he left the club.

On 21 June 2013 Campos was appointed at the helm of La Hoya Lorca CF, and led the club to a second place in their first campaign in division three. 

On July 4, 2018 Campos was appointed the new head coach of CF Salmantino.

Managerial statistics

References

External links

1966 births
Living people
People from Mazarrón
Spanish footballers
Footballers from the Region of Murcia
Association football defenders
Segunda División B players
Tercera División players
CD Alcoyano footballers
Real Jaén footballers
UD Melilla footballers
Spanish football managers
Real Murcia managers
Real Jaén managers
FC Cartagena managers
Lorca FC managers
UCAM Murcia CF managers
Salamanca CF UDS managers
Club Recreativo Granada managers